The Europe/Africa Zone was one of three zones of regional Federation Cup qualifying competition in 1994. All ties were played at Freizeit Park in Bad Waltersdorf, Austria.

The twenty-four teams were divided into eight teams of three to compete in round-robin matches. After each of the ties had been played, the teams that finished first and second in each of the respective pools would then move on to the knockout stage of the competition. The four teams that won two matches of the knockout stage would go on to advance to the World Group.

Pool Stage
 Date: April 18–22

 Teams finishing last in their group will form the Europe/Africa Zone Group II in 1995.

Knockout stage

References

 Fed Cup Profile, Belgium
 Fed Cup Profile, Turkey
 Fed Cup Profile, Austria
 Fed Cup Profile, Portugal
 Fed Cup Profile, Georgia
 Fed Cup Profile, Ukraine
 Fed Cup Profile, Romania
 Fed Cup Profile, Hungary
 Fed Cup Profile, Slovakia
 Fed Cup Profile, Greece
 Fed Cup Profile, Great Britain
 Fed Cup Profile, Russia
 Fed Cup Profile, Belarus
 Fed Cup Profile, Israel
 Fed Cup Profile, Slovenia
 Fed Cup Profile, Zimbabwe

See also
Fed Cup structure

 
Europe Africa
Tennis tournaments in Austria
Ten